Yowlqonluy-e Jadid (also Romanized as Yowlqonlūy-e Jadīd; also known as Yolghoonlooé Jadid, Yowlqūnlū-ye Jadīd, Yūlqūnlū-ye Jadīd, and Yurgakli) is a village in Gavdul-e Gharbi Rural District, in the Central District of Malekan County, East Azerbaijan Province, Iran. At the 2006 census, its population was 2,254, in 627 families.

References 

Populated places in Malekan County